Louise Adams Holland (3 July 1893–21 June 1990) was a philologist, university teacher, academic and archaeologist.

Early life and education
Born in Brooklyn in New York State (it would not become part of New York City until five years later) in 1893 as Louise Elizabeth Whetenhall Adams, she was the third child but first daughter of six children of Henrietta (née Rozier) and Charles Frederick Adams, a lawyer. Her younger sister was the United States Poet Laureate Léonie Adams. Louise Holland graduated from Barnard College in 1914 having specialised in Greek, and was awarded her M. A. from Columbia University and her Ph.D. from Bryn Mawr College in 1920, where she studied Latin. She studied at the American Academy in Rome from 1916 to 1917 as a Bryn Mawr Special Travelling Fellow and it was here that she developed an interest in topography. In 1918 she became Instructor in Latin at Smith College and in 1921 she became Assistant Professor of Latin there.

Academic career

She married the archaeologist Leicester Bodine Holland (1882-1952) in Philadelphia in 1923 and their daughter Barbara Adams Holland was born in 1925. Her book The Faliscans in Prehistoric Times was published in Rome in 1925. The couple both taught at Vassar College — she lecturing in Latin and he in Art History. A second daughter, Marian Rupert Holland, was born in 1927 and Leicester Holland was appointed as Chief of the Division of Fine Arts at the Library of Congress while Louise taught at Bryn Mawr. Their son Lawrence Rozier Holland was born in 1930.

During World War II Holland did war work for Midvale Steel, returning to teach at Bryn Mawr College after the war. From 1948 to 1949 she was the recipient of a Guggenheim Fellowship and from then on taught at Haverford College before moving to teach at Miami University in 1952. Her husband died in 1952 and in 1957 she returned to Smith College remaining there until her retirement in 1964 apart from a period from 1959 to 1960 when she was a resident scholar at the American Academy in Rome.

Later life
After leaving Smith College Holland was awarded numerous honors including an honorary doctorate from Smith College in 1965, the Distinguished Alumna Award from Barnard College in 1978 and Doctor of Letters from Columbia University in 1979. During this period she published: Janus and the Bridge (1961) and Lucretius and the Transpadanes (1979). In her later years Holland suffered from macular degeneration and became blind.

Louise Holland suffered a stroke in 1985 and while recovered physically, her memory began to fail. She remained as a resident in a convalescent home in Philadelphia until her death in 1990, just short of her 97th birthday.

References

External links
Biographical Sketches of Past Bryn Mawr College Faculty in Greek and Latin

1893 births
1990 deaths
Writers from Brooklyn
Barnard College alumni
Columbia University alumni
Bryn Mawr College alumni
Smith College faculty
Vassar College faculty
Bryn Mawr College faculty
Haverford College faculty
Miami University faculty
American topographers
American philologists
Women philologists
20th-century American archaeologists
20th-century philologists
Historians from New York (state)
20th-century cartographers